= Yannan Web =

- Founded: August 19, 2004
- Dissolved: September 30, 2005
- Website: www.yannan.cn

The Yannan Web, whose domain name was www.yannan.cn, was a Beijing-based renowned liberal website founded on August 19, 2004. It was associated with Peking University, and provided a free and rational speech platform for users to users to discuss current affairs and livelihood issues online. The site was known for its in-depth analysis and discussion of social issues in China.

== Shut down ==
The www.yannan.cn domain name was registered on February 9, 2004. Yannan Web was shut down on September 30, 2005 for its extensive and timely reports of the Taishi Village recall incident.
